Kamianka is a rural settlement in Horlivka Raion (district) in Donetsk Oblast of eastern Ukraine, at 75.6 km NNE from the centre of Donetsk city.

The War in Donbass, that started in mid-April 2014, has brought along both civilian and military casualties. A minivan, filled with explosives, was blown up at the Ukrainian check-point near the settlement on 21 July 2014, killing five Ukrainian servicemen.

Demographics
Native language as of the Ukrainian Census of 2001:
Ukrainian — 16.71%
Russian 83.29%

References

Villages in Horlivka Raion